During the 1906–07 season Hibernian, a football club based in Edinburgh, finished eleventh out of 18 clubs in the Scottish First Division.

Scottish First Division

Final League table

Scottish Cup

See also
List of Hibernian F.C. seasons

References

External links
Hibernian 1906/1907 results and fixtures, Soccerbase

Hibernian F.C. seasons
Hibernian